Joseph D. Ward (March 26, 1914 – May 10, 2003) was an American politician who served as Massachusetts Secretary of the Commonwealth from January 1959 to January 1961.

Ward was elected to the Massachusetts House of Representatives in 1948, representing the 13th Worcester District. He was a candidate for Massachusetts Attorney General in 1956, but lost to Edward J. McCormack Jr. in the Democratic primary. Ward was appointed Secretary of the Commonwealth following the death of Edward J. Cronin. In 1960, Ward ran for Governor of Massachusetts. He defeated Endicott Peabody, Francis E. Kelly, Robert F. Murphy, John Francis Kennedy, Gabriel Piemonte, and Alfred Magaletta in the primary, but lost to John A. Volpe in the general election. He was elected to the Massachusetts Senate in 1962 and remained there until his retirement from politics in 1972.

Ward also spent 12 years as a professor of political law at Boston University.

See also
 Massachusetts legislature: 1949–1950, 1951–1952, 1953–1954, 1955–1956

References

1914 births
2003 deaths
Politicians from Fitchburg, Massachusetts
Boston University faculty
College of the Holy Cross alumni
Boston University School of Law alumni
Democratic Party Massachusetts state senators
Democratic Party members of the Massachusetts House of Representatives
Secretaries of the Commonwealth of Massachusetts
20th-century American politicians